Sibalom, officially the Municipality of Sibalom, ,  is a 2nd class municipality in the province of Antique, Philippines. According to the 2020 census, it has a population of 63,833 people. Making it second most populous municipality in the province of Antique and fifth largest municipality in terms of land area, with a total area of 201.30 square kilometers.

Sibalom is home to the University of Antique.

Geography

According to the Philippine Statistics Authority, the municipality has a land area of  constituting  of the  total area of Antique.

Climate

Barangays
Sibalom is politically subdivided into 76 barangays. From 1953 to 1955, Barangay Catmon was known as Barangay Pajarito.

Demographics

In the 2020 census, Sibalom had a population of 63,833.

Economy

Sibalom Natural Park

Sibalom Natural Park, one of the last patches of lowland forest on Panay Island and the first protected area in the island, harbors many unique species of plants and animals, some of which are on the brink of extinction. About  of forest in Sibalom from Mount Porras extending to Mount Igmatindog, covering Sibalom river and its main tributaries Mao-it river and Tipulu-an river, was declared a natural park on April 23, 2000. Of this forest,  are undisturbed by any human activity while about  constitutes the 50-year-old reforestation site. One highlight is the Rafflesia speciosa, discovered in Mount Porras and surrounding Barangays in 2002. Dubbed the biggest bloom in the world, its discovery put Sibalom in the map of tourist stopovers in the Philippines. Sibalom also has century-old industries and structures, as well as boulders of gemstones and treacherous mountain trails.

Tourism
Sibalom's tourism industry dawned after the proclamation of the Sibalom Natural Park.

References

External links

 [ Philippine Standard Geographic Code]

Municipalities of Antique (province)